Sauber Petronas Engineering AG (SPE) was a company owned jointly by the Swiss racing car manufacturer Sauber (60%) and the Malaysian oil company Petronas (40%). It was founded in 1996 for the purpose of supplying engines to the Sauber Formula One team but at the same time the company began work on the design of production car engines for the Malaysian national car company Proton. The company also helped develop racing motorcycles like Petronas GP1.

Former Honda and Ferrari engineer Osamu Goto was in charge of the Powertrain Division, including the F1 engine program.

The engines were for many years nearly identical to the ones used by Ferrari but were branded Petronas. Sauber licensed nearly every legally licensable part from Ferrari and even had several Ferrari engineers on staff. Many pointed out suspicious similarities between Ferrari and Sauber chassis, but no formal accusations were ever made, even if FIA rules require each team to design their own chassis. 
The long-term aim of Sauber Petronas was to design and build its own F1 engines for the 1999 season but the programme was abandoned, choosing instead to continue with the Ferrari units.

In 1998, Petronas commissioned the Powertrain Division of SPE to design their own first commercial automotive engine, the Petronas E01e engine.

After the 2005 season, Sauber was bought by BMW and the co-operation with Ferrari ended.

Formula One engine results
(key; results in bold indicate pole position; results in italics indicate fastest lap)

References

Formula One engine manufacturers
Petronas
Engine manufacturers of Switzerland
Sauber Motorsport